Polygrammodes hartigi is a moth in the family Crambidae. It was described by Eugene G. Munroe in 1958. It is found in Chiapas in Mexico and in Costa Rica.

References

Spilomelinae
Moths described in 1958
Moths of Central America